Babol Posht (also Romanized as Bābol Posht; also known as Bālā Bābol Posht) is a village in Babolrud Rural District, in the Central District of Babolsar County, Mazandaran Province, Iran. At the 2006 census, its population was 1,455, in 393 families.

References 

Populated places in Babolsar County